Stacy Valentine (born August 9, 1970) is an American former pornographic actress. She is a member of both the AVN and XRCO Halls of Fame.

Biography
Adopted by her parents in Tulsa, Oklahoma and married at a young age, Valentine posed for Gallery magazine's "Girl Next Door" amateur photo contest. She won the contest and parlayed this into a follow-up spread in Hustler magazine. While shooting for Hustler in Mexico, she posed for a boy-girl layout for Hustler’s offshoot magazine, Rage. She enjoyed the shoot and agreed to perform in Coast-to-Coast's hardcore film Bikini Beach 4. A week after filming, she returned home, packed up her belongings, left her husband, and moved to Los Angeles to become a full-time adult actress.

Valentine took her stage name from the fact that she appeared in her first adult film on February 14, 1996. Her last film was made exactly four years later in 2000. Valentine knew early on that she did not want to be in the adult industry too long. "The goal when you get into the business is that you want to be a contract girl and you want to get the awards. I was a contract girl. I got the awards. I fought very hard to climb that ladder and I would be damned if I was going to climb down it. So I thought, this is a perfect time to make my exit."

As of 2010, Valentine lived in California, working as a director and model recruiter for Penthouse magazine. She previously held the same job title working from Florida.

As of 2015, she was still working for Penthouse, with the professional title "West Coast Creative Director".

The Girl Next Door
In the late-1990s, Valentine spent two years filming as the subject of a 1999 documentary called The Girl Next Door, by director Christine Fugate (not to be confused with the 2004 feature film of the same name). The movie also featured other adult film performers such as Nina Hartley, Jenna Jameson and Julian Andretti.  The New York Times review of the film said:

Awards and nominations
 1997 XRCO Award winner – Best New Starlet
 1997 Editor's Choice – Best New Starlet
 1998 F.O.X.E. Award – Female Fan Favorite (shared with Jenna Jameson, Tiffany Mynx & Stephanie Swift)
 1998 Hot D'Or Award winner – Best American Starlet
 1999 XRCO Award winner – Female Performer of the Year
 1999 F.O.X.E. Award – Female Fan Favorite (shared with Alisha Klass & Christi Lake)
 1999 Barcelona International Award – Best Actress
 2009 XRCO Hall of Fame inductee
 2012 AVN Hall of Fame inductee

References

External links

 
 
 
 
 
 "The Girl Next Door" review
 Stacey Valentine - Interview
 The History of Sex in Cinema: The Girl Next Door (1999)

1970 births
American female adult models
American pornographic film actresses
American adoptees
Living people
Actresses from Tulsa, Oklahoma
Pornographic film actors from Oklahoma
21st-century American women